Samuel Castelán Marini, better known as Samuel Castelli (born 7 May1985 in Zentla, Veracruz, Mexico) is a Mexican singer who won the fifth season of the Mexican reality show La Academia.

Discography 
Samuel, Mi Historia En La Academia, released 16 January 2007

Telenovela soundtracks
2009: Pasion Morena (writer and vocal)
2011: "Vive" (vocal), duet with Marta Sanchez 
2012: "Amor Cautivo" (writer), sung by Julio Preciado and Myriam
2012: "Doble cara" (writer), sung by Yahir and Alexis Montoya of La Academia 10

References

External links 
YouTube
Facebook
TikTok
Instagram

1985 births
Living people
La Academia winners
La Academia contestants
Mexican people of Italian descent
Singers from Veracruz
21st-century Mexican singers
21st-century Mexican male singers